AD 85 (LXXXV) was a common year starting on Saturday (link will display the full calendar) of the Julian calendar. At the time, it was known as the Year of the Consulship of Augustus and Fulvus (or, less frequently, year 838 Ab urbe condita). The denomination AD 85 for this year has been used since the early medieval period, when the Anno Domini calendar era became the prevalent method in Europe for naming years.

Events

By place

Roman Empire 
 Dacians under Decebalus engage in two wars against the Romans from this year to AD 88 or 89.
 Emperor Domitian repulses a Dacian invasion of Moesia.
 Domitian appoints himself censor for life, which gives him the right to control the Senate.  His totalitarian tendencies put the senatorial aristocracy firmly in opposition to him.

Asia 
 Baekje invades the outskirts of Silla in the Korean peninsula. The war continues until the peace treaty of 105.

Births 
 Marcion of Sinope, Greek theologian and founder of Marcionism (d. 160)
 Vibia Matidia (the Younger), Roman noblewoman (approximate date)

Deaths 
 Gaius Oppius Sabinus, Roman politician and governor
 Lucius Mindius, Roman politician and aristocrat
 Titus Atilius Rufus, Roman politician and governor

References 

0085

als:80er#Johr 85